General elections were held in Malaysia on Sunday, 21 March 2004. Voting took place in all 219 parliamentary constituencies, each electing one Member of Parliament to the Dewan Rakyat, the dominant house of Parliament. They were the first elections for Abdullah Ahmad Badawi as Prime Minister following his appointment in 2003. State elections also took place in 505 state constituencies in twelve of the thirteen states (except Sarawak) on the same day as Sabah took the first time election was parallel with the rest of Peninsular Malaysia.

The Barisan Nasional received 64% of the vote (but would have gained a higher vote had all seats been contested) and won 198 seats to the combined opposition parties' 20 seats, with one independent. This was the largest majority that the Barisan Nasional had won since the 1978. The dominant party in the National Front, the United Malays National Organisation (UMNO), won 109 seats, a gain of 37. UMNO's allies also gained seats; the Malaysian Chinese Association won 31 seats, a gain of two, and the Malaysian Indian Congress won nine seats, a gain of two.

The Pan-Malaysian Islamic Party (PAS) managed to retain only seven of its 27 seats. PAS ran on a platform promising an Islamic nation. The PAS opposition leader, Datuk Seri Abdul Hadi Awang, lost his parliamentary seat. Another opposition party, the People's Justice Party (Parti Keadilan Nasional) lost four of its five seats. After five recounts the party's leader, Wan Azizah Wan Ismail (the wife of imprisoned former Deputy Prime Minister Anwar Ibrahim), retained her seat with a majority of 590 votes.

The third opposition party, the Democratic Action Party (DAP), which was routed in the 1999 elections, improved its performance with the re-election of party chairman Lim Kit Siang in Ipoh Timor seat and his deputy, Karpal Singh in Bukit Gelugor seat although chairman Kerk Kim Hock lost his seat. The DAP won 12 seats and regained the official leadership of the opposition in the national parliament from PAS.

Most candidates who campaigned on platforms of Islamic issues lost their seats. This was a significant turnaround compared to the previous elections, where generally the more "Islamic" candidates had a greater chance of winning in the Malay heartland.

Background
On 2 March, the tenth national parliament and all state assemblies in Malaysia (with the exception of Sarawak) were dissolved by the Yang di-Pertuan Agong upon the advice of the Prime Minister. Sarawak's last state election was held in 2001, and elections for the state assembly were not due till 2006.

The elections were held nine months earlier than required by the constitution. The constitution allowed for a parliamentary term of up to five years. Elections were required to be called three months after parliament is dissolved. The government had until the end of November 2004 to call elections.

Campaign
Candidates were nominated on 13 March, with the National Front winning 15 seats uncontested, and another two seats after the opposing candidates withdrew. The right to withdraw was only introduced as a new rule at these elections. Under this rule candidates are allowed a three-day period to withdraw following nomination day. Of the 17 parliamentary seats won uncontested, nine were in the state of Sabah, six in Sarawak and two in Johor.

PAS won a state assembly seat Senggarang in Johor for the first time, after the National Front candidate was disqualified because she was seconded by someone who was not a registered voter in the constituency that she wanted to contest. The requirement that the seconder be registered in the same constituency was only introduced in 2004. This seat was influenced by other opposition parties to gain many state seat in 2008 contest.

Conduct
The elections were marred by discrepancies, which were admitted by the electoral authorities. The head of the Election Commission (Tan Sri Ab Rashid Ab Rahman) made the statement "I have been in this line for so long... it should not have happened at all. There must be reasons why this happened." He has served in the election commission for the last five elections, and has stated that he intends to resign if a report on the discrepancies implicates him in the foul-ups.

Among the discrepancies were wrongly printed ballots, registered voters being unable to vote and wide discrepancies in votes in various seats upon re-counting the ballots.

In the seat of Sungai Lembing in state of Pahang, the Keadilan symbol was printed wrongly on the ballot paper for PAS candidate Idris Ahmad. Illiterate voters tend to rely on familiar party symbols for voting purposes as they are unable to read the candidate's names on the ballot. Voting was suspended for 5 hours before resuming. Polling was re-held for the seat on 28 March.

Results

By state

Johor

Kedah

Kelantan

Kuala Lumpur

Labuan

Malacca

Negeri Sembilan

Pahang

Penang

Perak

Perlis

Sabah

Sarawak

Selangor

Terengganu

See also
2004 Malaysian state elections

Further reading

References

External links
The (Malaysian) Star Online
ChannelNewsAsia
Bernama
Election Commission Malaysia (SPR) 
Results from the SPR 

Malaysia
General
General elections in Malaysia